Arjun Halappa  (born 13 December 1980) is a professional Indian hockey player and former captain of Indian Hockey Team.

Career
Midfield maestro Arjun Halappa is the son of former East Bengal Hockey Club player B. K. Halappa,

He hails from Kodagu (Coorg) District, Karnataka.  He joined the Centre of Excellence in 1998 and a year later played his first Senior Nationals at Hyderabad, and was picked among the 72 probables for a conditioning camp. He made his junior international debut in the Europe tour same year under coaches C.R. Kumar and Harendera. He posted eight goals in the 2000 Junior Asia Cup.

He made his international debut for the Men's National Team in March 2001 against Egypt in the Prime Minister's Gold Cup. Halappa represented India at the 2004 Summer Olympics, where India finished in seventh place. He represented India at the 2010 Commonwealth Games in New Delhi, where India finished in second place.

Personal life
He married Bhavana on 12 October 2008 at Somwarpet, Kodagu.

References

External links
 
 Bharatiya Hockey

1980 births
Living people
Male field hockey forwards
2002 Men's Hockey World Cup players
Field hockey players at the 2004 Summer Olympics
Field hockey players at the 2006 Commonwealth Games
Field hockey players at the 2006 Asian Games
2006 Men's Hockey World Cup players
Field hockey players at the 2010 Commonwealth Games
Field hockey players at the 2010 Asian Games
2010 Men's Hockey World Cup players
Olympic field hockey players of India
People from Kodagu district
Field hockey players from Karnataka
Asian Games medalists in field hockey
World Series Hockey players
Indian male field hockey players
Asian Games bronze medalists for India
Commonwealth Games silver medallists for India
Commonwealth Games medallists in field hockey
Medalists at the 2010 Asian Games
Delhi Waveriders players
Hockey India League players
Recipients of the Rajyotsava Award 2004
Medallists at the 2010 Commonwealth Games